Thule, minor planet designation: 279 Thule, is a large asteroid from the outer asteroid belt. It is classified as a D-type asteroid and is probably composed of organic-rich silicates, carbon and anhydrous silicates.  Thule was the first asteroid discovered with a semi-major axis greater than 4 AU.  It was discovered by Johann Palisa on 25 October 1888 in Vienna and was named after the ultimate northern land of Thule.

Thule asteroids 

The orbits of these bodies are unusual. They orbit in the outermost edge of the asteroid belt in a 4:3 orbital resonance with Jupiter, the result of the periodic force Jupiter exerts on a body with Thule's orbital period, in the same way (though with the reverse effect) as the Kirkwood gaps in the more inner parts of the asteroid belt.

References

External links 
 
 

Thule asteroids
Background asteroids
Thule
Thule
D-type asteroids (Tholen)
X-type asteroids (SMASS)
18881025